Federico Gino Acevedo Fagúndez (born 26 February 1993) is a Uruguayan professional footballer who plays as a midfielder for Greek Super League club PAS Giannina.

Club career
After graduating from Defensor Sporting's youth system, Gino made his professional debut on 25 August 2013, in a 1–1 home draw against Peñarol.

PAS Giannina
In December 2022, he signed for PAS Giannina in Super League Greece.

Honours
2013 FIFA U-20 World Cup: Runner Up

References

External links
 
 
 

1993 births
Living people
Uruguayan people of Italian descent
Uruguayan footballers
Uruguayan expatriate footballers
Association football midfielders
Uruguay under-20 international footballers
People from Melo, Uruguay
Defensor Sporting players
A.C. Carpi players
Aldosivi footballers
All Boys footballers
Cruzeiro Esporte Clube players
Atlético San Luis footballers
Club Atlético Platense footballers
Uruguayan Primera División players
Argentine Primera División players
Campeonato Brasileiro Série A players
Liga MX players
PAS Giannina F.C. players
Super League Greece players
Uruguayan expatriate sportspeople in Argentina
Uruguayan expatriate sportspeople in Brazil
Uruguayan expatriate sportspeople in Greece
Uruguayan expatriate sportspeople in Italy
Uruguayan expatriate sportspeople in Mexico
Expatriate footballers in Argentina
Expatriate footballers in Brazil
Expatriate footballers in Greece
Expatriate footballers in Italy
Expatriate footballers in Mexico